Springtail Point is a rock point 3 nautical miles (6 km) north of Skew Peak in the Clare Range, Victoria Land. Named by Heinz Janetschek, biologist at McMurdo Station (1961–62), because of a find of springtail insects at this location.

References

Headlands of Victoria Land
Scott Coast